Xiao Tao Sheng (萧涛生) (born 1946) is a Chinese painter who specializes in portraying Chinese culture through his Western-style oil paintings, called East in West paintings.  He is a class I painter and professor, and currently the vice director of the Sichuan Provincial Art Museum.  He is a member of the China Artists Association.

Xiao's art works were introduced to the public by China Central Television (CCTV), Sichuan TV and Chengdu TV. Most of his award-winning paintings had been selected for national exhibitions in China and abroad, including the International Arts City, Paris in December 2003 and at the south lobby of the United Nations Secretariat, New York in January 2005. The publications about his work namely Collection of Sketches by Xiao Tao Sheng and Collection of Oil Paintings by Xiao Tao Sheng had been included in the collections of the U.S. Library of Congress, New York City's Columbia University Library and the Chinese University of Hong Kong.  His works had also been published in art magazines in China, Japan, Hong Kong, the United States and Canada.

References

People's Republic of China painters
1946 births
Living people